Lacinipolia is a moth genus in the family Noctuidae.

Species
 Lacinipolia acutipennis (Grote, 1880)
 Lacinipolia agnata (Smith, 1905)
 Lacinipolia aileenae Selman & Leuschner, 2001 
 Lacinipolia anguina (Grote, 1881)
 Lacinipolia basiplaga (Smith, 1905)
 Lacinipolia baueri Selman & Leuschner, 2001
 Lacinipolia bucketti Selman & Leuschner, 2001  
 Lacinipolia buscki (Barnes & Benjamin, 1927)
 Lacinipolia calcaricosta Todd & Poole, 1981
 Lacinipolia canities (Hampson, 1905)
 Lacinipolia ciniva (Schaus, 1898)
 Lacinipolia circumcincta (Smith, 1891)
 Lacinipolia cleptoschema (Dyar, 1912)
 Lacinipolia comis (Grote, 1876) (syn. L. lunolacta (Smith, 1903))
 Lacinipolia consimilis McDunnough, 1937
 Lacinipolia cuneata (Grote, 1873)
 Lacinipolia datis (Druce, 1894)
 Lacinipolia davena (Smith, 1901)
 Lacinipolia delongi Selman & Leuschner, 2001 
 Lacinipolia dima (Dyar, 1916)
 Lacinipolia dimocki Schmidt, 2015
 Lacinipolia distributa (Möschler, 1886)
 Lacinipolia erecta (Walker, [1857])
 Lacinipolia eucyria (Dyar, 1910)
 Lacinipolia explicata McDunnough, 1937 – Explicit Arches
 Lacinipolia falsa (Grote, 1880)
 Lacinipolia fordi Selman & Leuschner, 2001
 Lacinipolia francisca (Smith, 1910)
 Lacinipolia franclemonti Selman & Leuschner, 2001 
 Lacinipolia gnata (Grote, 1882)
 Lacinipolia hamara (Druce, 1889)
 Lacinipolia hodeva (Druce, 1889)
 Lacinipolia implicata McDunnough, 1938 – Implicit Arches
 Lacinipolia incurva (Smith, 1888)
 Lacinipolia laudabilis (Guenée, 1852)
 Lacinipolia lepidula (Smith, 1888)
 Lacinipolia leucogramma (Grote, 1873)
 Lacinipolia longiclava (Smith, 1891)
 Lacinipolia lorea (Guenée, 1852)
 Lacinipolia lustralis (Grote, 1875) (syn. L. selama (Strecker, 1898))
 Lacinipolia luteimacula (Barnes & Benjamin, 1925)
 Lacinipolia marinitincta (Harvey, 1875)
 Lacinipolia marmica (Schaus, 1898)
 Lacinipolia martini Selman & Leuschner, 2001
 Lacinipolia meditata (Grote, 1873) (syn. L. brachiolum (Harvey, 1876), L. determinata (Smith, 1891), L. rubrifusa (Hampson, 1905))
 Lacinipolia mimula (Grote, 1883)
 Lacinipolia naevia (Smith, 1898)
 Lacinipolia naida (Dyar, 1910)
 Lacinipolia olivacea (Morrison, 1875)
 Lacinipolia palilis (Harvey, 1875)
 Lacinipolia parens (Schaus, 1894)
 Lacinipolia parvula (Herrich-Schäffer, 1868)
 Lacinipolia patalis (Grote, 1873)
 Lacinipolia pensilis (Grote, 1874)
 Lacinipolia perfragilis (Dyar, 1923)
 Lacinipolia perta (Druce, 1889)
 Lacinipolia phaulocyria (Dyar, 1910)
 Lacinipolia prognata McDunnough, 1940
 Lacinipolia quadrilineata (Grote, 1873)
 Lacinipolia rectilinea (Smith, 1888)
 Lacinipolia renigera (Stephens, 1829) – Bristly Cutworm, Kidney-Spotted Minor 
 Lacinipolia rodora (Dyar, 1910)
 Lacinipolia roseosuffusa (Smith, 1900)
 Lacinipolia rubens (Druce, 1889)
 Lacinipolia runica (Hampson, 1918)
 Lacinipolia sareta (Smith, 1906)
 Lacinipolia sharonae Selman & Leuschner, 2001 
 Lacinipolia spiculosa (Grote, 1883)
 Lacinipolia stenotis (Hampson, 1905)
 Lacinipolia stricta (Walker, 1865)
 Lacinipolia strigicollis (Wallengren, 1860) (syn. L. illaudabilis (Grote, 1875))
 Lacinipolia subalba Mustelin, 2000
 Lacinipolia surgens (Dyar, 1910)
 Lacinipolia teligera (Morrison, 1875)
 Lacinipolia transvitta (Dyar, 1913)
 Lacinipolia trasca (Dyar, 1912)
 Lacinipolia tricornuta McDunnough, 1937
 Lacinipolia triplehorni Selman & Leuschner, 2001 
 Lacinipolia uliginosa (Smith, 1905)
 Lacinipolia umbrosa (Smith, 1888)
 Lacinipolia verruca (Dyar, 1914)
 Lacinipolia vicina (Grote, 1874)
 Lacinipolia viridifera McDunnough, 1937
 Lacinipolia vittula (Grote, 1883)

References

External links
Lacinipolia at funet.fi
 Lacinipolia. Natural History Museum, London.

Orthosiini